The Château de Fougeret is a château, located in Queaux, in the French department of Vienne, Nouvelle-Aquitaine, France. It was built between the 15th and 16th centuries and widely renovated during the 19th century.

It has been listed as a historical monument since 2010.

Description 
It has a  along the Vienne River with an arboretum of species coming from the New World, such as American walnuts, giant sequoias, etc. 

The corps de logis is flanked by three round towers and a chapel. Two independent towers are added close to the main building. 

The leaflet from the Ministry of Culture, which designated the château as a historical monument, mentions for example a few remarkable elements; wall paintings and frescoes, ceilings with flat floor arches decorated and painted, a mosaic, woodwork, a monumental Gothic fireplace made of sculpted stone, a spiral staircase built of stone in Gothic style with a tracery railing like the staircase of Chambord and mullioned windows. 

It has kept some elements from the Middle Ages, including its brattices, basement, sarcophagus, icehouse and two mullioned windows. Its renovation in the 19th century by a bourgeois family was done to modernise and stage the richness and the significance of its owners. Another level is added, the distribution and the organisation of the windows are rethought and the inside becomes advanced.

In 2009, Véronique Geffroy and her husband François buy the château, after years of abandon and decide to restore it to move in.

Paranormal activities 

After they bought the château in 2009, the new owners have to face with the lack of money and the discovery of new unplanned repairs.    

According to them, they have been the witnesses of paranormal events, which leads them to organise paranormal nights in the château from 2010 despite the very bad state and the risk for the visitors (electric hazard, weak floors, lack of fire alarm, safety lighting, emergency exits, etc.).    

The concept works well and attracts a lot of people. So much that a lot of media dedicated TV shows to the story and its paranormal activity. Fougeret is regularly referred to on internet and television as "the most haunted place in France". These shows and a lot of YouTubers made for the fame of the château.

References 

Châteaux in Vienne
Monuments historiques of Vienne